The Qingjing Mosque, also known as the Ashab Mosque, is a mosque located in the city of Quanzhou, Fujian, China. It is found on Tumen Street. In 2021, the mosque was inscribed on the UNESCO World Heritage List along with other sites in and around Quanzhou because of its religious significance in the Song and Yuan dynasties, its importance to the medieval maritime trade of China, and its testimony to the global exchange of ideas and cultures during that time.

History
Constructed in 1009, the Arab style mosque is the oldest of its kind in China.

Architecture

Its area is 2,500 square metres. Many Song dynasty mosques were built in this Arabian style in coastal cities, due to communities of Arab merchants living in them. the entrance of Quanzhou Qingjingsi Mosque is the only example of stone entrances in mainland China. The inscriptions of the Quanzhou Qingjingsi mosque was dominated by the Arabic language.

See also
 Islam in China
 List of mosques in China

References

Further reading

External links

 Fuzhou's Historic Qingjing Mosque

11th-century mosques
Mosques in China
Buildings and structures in Quanzhou
Religious buildings and structures completed in 1009
Major National Historical and Cultural Sites in Fujian